The Dujayl Canal was a medieval irrigation canal providing water to Baghdad. Originally it brought water from the Euphrates, but by the end of the 10th century its connection to that river had silted up, and a new connection was dug to the Tigris river.

Sources 
 , pp. 51, 65, 80, 85

Irrigation canals
Euphrates
Tigris River
Iraq under the Abbasid Caliphate